Georg Beijers ( – ) was a Dutch male footballer.

Club career
Born in Rotterdam, Beijers played for local side V.O.C.

International career
He was part of the Netherlands national football team, playing 1 match on 24 August 1919 against Sweden.

See also
 List of Dutch international footballers

References

1895 births
1978 deaths
Footballers from Rotterdam
Association football forwards
Dutch footballers
Netherlands international footballers